Jacob Hilsdorf (10 June 1872, Bingen – 11 January 1916, Frankfurt am Main) was a German photographer.

Life and work 
His father, Johann Baptist Hilsdorf, was also a photographer. He and his older brother, Theodor, who would also become a photographer, took their first lessons in his studio. They also studied drawing with an artist in Mainz. After completing his training, he worked at the studios of Nicola Perscheid in Leipzig. There, he met Elisabeth Gausche, who he married in 1897 in Bad Kreuznach. When his father died, he took over the studio in Bingen and hired his brother, Hans, as an assistant.

Around the turn of the century, he came into contact with many well-known personalities; including the intellectuals who associated with the poet, Stefan George. He first made his name in 1903, with a series of photographs featuring the artist, Melchior Lechter, then went on to do portraits of painters, musicians and writers, as well as members of the nobility and politicians. In 1912, Ernest Louis, Grand Duke of Hesse, named him a "Grand Ducal Councilor", in recognition of his work for the Royal Family.

Despite his success, he was plagued with personal problems. His marriage to Elisabeth ended in divorce in 1909. Two years later, he married Ellen Hasenclever, but their relationship was also troubled and unhappy. In 1915, he began to display symptoms of mental illness. Early the following year, he committed suicide.

His work was mostly forgotten, until a major retrospective was held in Bingen in 1978.

Selected portraits

Sources 
 Berthold Roland (Ed.): Nicola Perscheid, Theodor und Jacob Hilsdorf, August Sander. Der rheinland-pfälzische Beitrag zur Geschichte der Photographie, exhibition catalog, Landesmuseum Mainz, 1989

External links 

 
 Brief biography @ LRP Online

1872 births
1916 deaths
German photographers
Portrait photographers
Photographers from Hesse
1916 suicides
People from Bingen am Rhein
Suicides in Germany